Jaspidiconus is a subgenus of sea snails, marine gastropod mollusks in the genus Conasprella,  family Conidae, the cone snails and their allies.

In the new classification of the family Conidae by Puillandre N., Duda T.F., Meyer C., Olivera B.M. & Bouchet P. (2015), Jaspidiconus has become a subgenus of Conasprella: Conasprella (Ximeniconus) Tucker & Tenorio, 2009 represented as Conasprella Thiele, 1929

Distinguishing characteristics
The Tucker & Tenorio 2009 taxonomy distinguishes Jaspidiconus from Conus in the following ways:

 Genus Conus sensu stricto Linnaeus, 1758
 Shell characters (living and fossil species)
The basic shell shape is conical to elongated conical, has a deep anal notch on the shoulder, a smooth periostracum and a small operculum. The shoulder of the shell is usually nodulose and the protoconch is usually multispiral. Markings often include the presence of tents except for black or white color variants, with the absence of spiral lines of minute tents and textile bars.
Radular tooth (not known for fossil species)
The radula has an elongated anterior section with serrations and a large exposed terminating cusp, a non-obvious waist, blade is either small or absent and has a short barb, and lacks a basal spur.
Geographical distribution
These species are found in the Indo-Pacific region.
Feeding habits
These species eat other gastropods including cones.

 Subgenus Jaspidiconus Petuch, 2003
Shell characters (living and fossil species)
The shell is turbinate in shape.  The protoconch is paucispiral with 1.5 whorls.  The anal notch is deep, and the anterior notch is absent.  The early whorls are not nodulose but may be ornamented by an undulating carina.  Later whorls may be ornamented with nodules.  Cords are absent on the whorls.  The periostracum is smooth, and the operculum is small.
Radular tooth (not known for fossil species)
The anterior sections of the radular tooth is shorter than the posterior section, and the blade is short.  A posterior fold is present, and the posterior blade is absent.  A basal spur is present, and the barb is short.  A shaft fold is present and is blunt at its anterior end.
Geographical distribution
These species are found in the West Atlantic region.
Feeding habits
These species are vermivorous, meaning that they prey on polychaete worms.

Species
This list of species is based on the information in the World Register of Marine Species (WoRMS) list. Species within the subgenus Jaspidiconus include:
 Jaspidiconus acutimarginatus (G. B. Sowerby II, 1866): synonym of Jaspidiconus jaspideus f. acutimarginatus (G. B. Sowerby II, 1866): synonym of Conus jaspideus Gmelin, 1791
 Jaspidiconus alexandremonteiroi Cossignani, 2014: synonym of Conasprella alexandremonteiroi (Cossignani, 2014) (alternate representation)
 Jaspidiconus allamandi Petuch, 2013: synonym of Conasprella allamandi (Petuch, 2013) (alternate representation)
 Jaspidiconus anaglypticus (Crosse, 1865): synonym of  Conus anaglypticus Crosse, 1865
 Jaspidiconus arawak Petuch & R. F. Myers, 2014: synonym of Conus arawak (Petuch & R. F. Myers, 2014) (alternate representation, original combination)
 Jaspidiconus berschaueri Petuch & R. F. Myers, 2014: synonym of Conus berschaueri (Petuch & R. F. Myers, 2014) (alternate representation, original combination)
 Jaspidiconus branhamae (Clench, 1953): synonym of  Conus branhamae Clench, 1953
 Jaspidiconus damasoi (Cossignani, 2007): synonym of  Conus damasoi Cossignani, 2007
 Jaspidiconus damasomonteiroi Petuch & Myers, 2014: synonym of Conus damasomonteiroi (Petuch & Myers, 2014) (alternate representation)
 Jaspidiconus ericmonnieri Petuch & R. F. Myers, 2014: synonym of Conus ericmonnieri (Petuch & R. F. Myers, 2014) (alternate representation, original combination)
 Jaspidiconus exumaensis Petuch, 2013: synonym of Conus jaspideus Gmelin, 1791
 Jaspidiconus fluviamaris Petuch & Sargent, 2011: synonym of Conus fluviamaris (Petuch & Sargent, 2011) (alternate representation)
 Jaspidiconus henckesi (Coltro, 2004): synonym of  Conus henckesi Coltro, 2004
 Jaspidiconus herndli Petuch & R. F. Myers, 2014: synonym of Conus herndli (Petuch & R. F. Myers, 2014) (alternate representation, original combination)
 Jaspidiconus iansa (Petuch, 1979): synonym of  Conasprella iansa Petuch, 1979
 Jaspidiconus jaspideus (Gmelin, 1791): synonym of  Conus jaspideus Gmelin, 1791
 Jaspidiconus mackintoshi Petuch, 2013: synonym of Conus mindanus Hwass in Bruguière, 1792
 Jaspidiconus marinae Petuch & Myers, 2014: synonym of Conus marinae (Petuch & Myers, 2014) (alternate representation)
 Jaspidiconus mindanus (Hwass in Bruguière, 1792): synonym of  Conus mindanus Hwass in Bruguière, 1792
 Jaspidiconus ogum Petuch & R. F. Myers, 2014: synonym of Conus ogum (Petuch & R. F. Myers, 2014) (alternate representation, original combination)
 Jaspidiconus oleiniki Petuch, 2013: synonym of Conus jaspideus Gmelin, 1791
 Jaspidiconus pealii (Green, 1840): synonym of Jaspidiconus jaspideus pealii (Green, 1830) represented as Conus jaspideus pealii Green, 1830
 Jaspidiconus pfluegeri Petuch, 2003: synonym of Jaspidiconus jaspideus pfluegeri Petuch, 2003 represented as Conus jaspideus pfluegeri Petuch, 2003
 Jaspidiconus pomponeti Petuch & Myers, 2014: synonym of Conus pomponeti (Petuch & Myers, 2014) (alternate representation)
 Jaspidiconus poremskii Petuch & R. F. Myers, 2014: synonym of Conus poremskii (Petuch & R. F. Myers, 2014) (alternate representation, original combination)
 Jaspidiconus pusio (Hwass in Bruguière, 1792): synonym of  Conus pusio Hwass in Bruguière, 1792
 Jaspidiconus rachelae (Petuch, 1988): synonym of  Conus rachelae Petuch, 1988
 Jaspidiconus roatanensis Petuch & Sargent, 2011: synonym of Conus roatanensis (Petuch & Sargent, 2011) (alternate representation)
 Jaspidiconus sargenti Petuch, 2013: synonym of Conus sargenti (Petuch, 2013) (alternate representation)
 Jaspidiconus simonei Petuch & R. F. Myers, 2014: synonym of Conus simonei (Petuch & R. F. Myers, 2014) (alternate representation, original combination)
 Jaspidiconus stearnsii (Conrad, 1869): synonym of  Conus stearnsii Conrad, 1869
 Jaspidiconus vanhyningi (Rehder, 1944): synonym of Conus vanhyningi Rehder, 1944 (alternate representation)

Significance of "alternative representation"
Prior to 2009, all cone species were placed within the family Conidae and were placed in one genus, Conus. In 2009 however, J.K. Tucker and M.J. Tenorio proposed a classification system for the over 600 recognized species that were in the family. Their classification proposed 3 distinct families and 82 genera for the living species of cone snails, including the family Conilithidae. This classification was based upon shell morphology, radular differences, anatomy, physiology, cladistics, with comparisons to molecular (DNA) studies. Published accounts of genera within the Conidae (or Conilithidae) that include the genus Jaspidiconus include J.K. Tucker & M.J. Tenorio (2009), and Bouchet et al. (2011).

Testing in order to try to understand the molecular phylogeny of the Conidae was initially begun by Christopher Meyer and Alan Kohn, and is continuing, particularly with the advent of nuclear DNA testing in addition to mDNA testing.

However, in 2011, some experts still prefer to use the traditional classification, where all species are placed in Conus within the single family Conidae: for example, according to the current November 2011 version of the World Register of Marine Species, all species within the family Conidae are in the genus Conus. The binomial names of species in the 82 cone snail genera listed in Tucker & Tenorio 2009 are recognized by the World Register of Marine Species as "alternative representations."  Debate within the scientific community regarding this issue continues, and additional molecular phylogeny studies are being carried out in an attempt to clarify the issue.

All this has been superseded in 2015 by the new classification of the Conidae

References

Further reading 
 Kohn A. A. (1992). Chronological Taxonomy of Conus, 1758-1840". Smithsonian Institution Press, Washington and London.
 Monteiro A. (ed.) (2007). The Cone Collector 1: 1-28.
 Berschauer D. (2010). Technology and the Fall of the Mono-Generic Family The Cone Collector 15: pp. 51-54
 Puillandre N., Meyer C.P., Bouchet P., and Olivera B.M. (2011), Genetic divergence and geographical variation in the deep-water Conus orbignyi complex (Mollusca: Conoidea)'', Zoologica Scripta 40(4) 350-363.

External links
 To World Register of Marine Species
  Gastropods.com: Conidae setting forth the genera recognized therein.
  Gastropods.com: Conilithidae setting forth the genera recognized therein.

Conidae
Gastropod subgenera